A Lan Lun A Lun Lan is a 2012 Burmese romantic-comedy film, directed by Nyi Nyi Htun Lwin starring Nay Toe, Thinzar Wint Kyaw, Melody, Soe Pyae Thazin, Nan Su Yati Soe and Wutt Hmone Shwe Yi.

Cast
Nay Toe as Swan Ka Bar
Thinzar Wint Kyaw as Cynthia
Melody as Dr. Thaw Thaw
Soe Pyae Thazin as Kay Tha Ri
Nan Su Yati Soe as Nyo Mi Thwin
Wutt Hmone Shwe Yi as May Tha Ra
Christina as Khin Phyu Phyu Htut
Chan Mi Mi Ko as Mermaid
Pwint as Daw Khin Lain
Zaw Win Naing as U Kaung Thit
Yoon Yoon as Thaw Thaw

References

2012 films
2010s Burmese-language films
Burmese romantic comedy films
Films shot in Myanmar
2012 romantic comedy films